Joni Waka is a Ghanaian movie directed and written by Van Vicker in 2012. The movie was Van Vicker's first movie in Twi.

Synopsis
Joni Waka goes back to his village because he has made a discovery about his homeland. He had a plan and just how to get it was a bit stressful but his unofficial guide Paa Nii  who is the village eye, gets things complicated. Meanwhile the innkeeper's wife expresses her affection for Joni and bully's any lady who gets closer to Joni. Joni also was the love of many women in the village.

Cast
 Van Vicker
 Agya Koo
 Adwoa Vicker
 Nikoletta Samonas
 Alex ‘Bomaye’ Biney
 CK Akunnor

References

Ghanaian drama films
2010s English-language films
English-language Ghanaian films